En Tus Manos is the twentieth  studio album by La Mafia.  It was released on June 3, 1997. 
 The album peaked at number four in the Billboard Regional Mexican Albums chart and also reached top ten in the Billboard Top Latin Albums chart. En Tus Manos earned them the Grammy Award for Best Mexican-American Performance at the 40th Grammy Awards.

Track listing

Chart performance

References

1997 albums
La Mafia albums
Spanish-language albums
Grammy Award for Best Mexican/Mexican-American Album